Columbina (in Italian Colombina, meaning "little dove"; in French and English Colombine) is a stock character in the commedia dell'arte. She is Harlequin's mistress, a comic servant playing the tricky slave type, and wife of Pierrot. Rudlin and Crick use the Italian spelling Colombina in Commedia dell'arte: A Handbook for Troupes.

History
The role of the female servant was originally that of an entr'acte dancer. Women were not allowed to be part of the story that was being played out on stage, but they were allowed to have a dance in-between the action. Eventually these women became the busom and gossipy servants of characters that were already allowed on stage, and then, later, the counterparts to the Zanni characters.  She was very down to earth and could always see the situation for what it actually was. She was also sometimes portrayed as a prostitute. She was very infrequently without something to say to or about someone.

She is dressed in a very short ragged and patched dress, appropriate to a master of the arts. These characters were usually played unmasked, but with bonnets and metal chokers.  She was also known to wear heavy makeup around her eyes and carry a tambourine, which she could use to fend off the amorous advances of Pantalone. Columbina was sometimes chased after by Arlecchino (also known as Harlequin) or was close friends with him. There is record of Columbine using numerous disguises to trick or seduce Harlequin. Where most other characters are content with one disguise, Gheraldi's Colombine has several different disguises to confuse Harlequin and to keep the audience on their toes. 

She was often the only functional intellect on the stage. Columbine aided her mistress, the innamorata, to gain the affections of her one true love.  She is sometimes the lover of Harlequin, but not always. They sometimes engage in sexual activity, but not always.  She may be a flirtatious and impudent character, indeed a soubrette.

In the verismo opera Pagliacci by Ruggero Leoncavallo, the head of the troupe's wife, Nedda, playing as Colombine, cheats on her husband, Canio, playing as Pagliaccio, both onstage with Harlequin and offstage with Silvio.

Although Colombine is one name associated with the female servant prostitute character archetype, other names under which the same character is played in Commedia dell'arte performances include Franceschina, Smeraldina, Oliva, Nespola, Spinetta Ricciolina, and Corallina Diamantina.  Colombina became the most common name used to describe the sobretta character, especially as Colombine in France and in England.

One of the actresses who made this character famous was Silvia Roncagli, the first woman recorded doing a seretta role named Francheschina in about 1570.  One of the first women to play the role named Colombina was Italian actress Isabella Franchini Biancolelli. Her granddaughter, Caterina Biancolelli, was one of the most famous serettas whose name was Colombina. She played the part about 1683.

There is record of the French playwright Molière having attended many performances of the comédie italienne, or commedia dell'arte.  He is even referenced in a performance by Angelo Costantini of his show Une Vie de Scaramouche, which refers to the writer and poet. This might suggest that the servant character in many of Molière's plays, such as Dorine in his play Tartuffe, might be based on this particular character archetype from the commedia dell'arte.

Gallery

See also
 Pierrot
 Harlequinade
Caterina Biancolelli

References

Bibliography

External links
 
 

Female stock characters
Fictional tricksters
Commedia dell'arte female characters
Fictional servants